Atef Abu Saif (born 1973) is a Palestinian writer. He was born in Jabalia refugee camp in the Gaza Strip. He studied at the University of Birzeit and the University of Bradford, before going on to obtain a PhD from the European University Institute in Florence.

Since his literary debut in the late 1990s, Abu Saif has written a number of novels and short story collections. His novel A Suspended Life (2014) was shortlisted for the 2015 Arabic Booker Prize. He published five other novels: Shadows in the memory (1997), Tale of the Harvest Night (1998), The Snow Ball (2000), The Salty Grape of Paradise (2003), and Running in Place (2019). In addition to that he published two collections of short stories: Everything is Normal and Stories from Gaza Time. Abu Saif edited as well a collection of short stories from Gaza titled The Book of Gaza, which includes as well one of his own short stories. It was published by Comma 2014.

A Suspended Life is going to be published in English autumn 2016 by Bloomsbury.

His account of the 2014 Gaza conflict was published in English under the title The Drone Eats with Me: Diaries from a City Under Fire, with a foreword by Noam Chomsky. Extracts from the diaries have appeared in Western publications such as Slate, Guernica, The Guardian and The New York Times. The Dairies appeared in Germany 2015 under the title Frühstück mit der Drohne, from Unionsverlag.

Abu Saif's 2019 novel Running in Placewas the first novel from Gaza to be translated into Hebrew and published in Israel.

On 5 February 2018, Fatah's Information, Culture, and Ideology Commission commissioned him as a spokesman for Fatah. Since 2019, he has been the Minister for Culture in the Palestine Authority.

In March 2019, Palestinian Authority news organization Wafa published pictures that showed Saif, bruised and bandaged, clothed in blood-stained garments and lying on a hospital bed. Wafa claimed that Saif had been beaten as Hamas attacked protestors and journalists; protestors were on the streets to demand better living conditions.

References

Assorted works

Palestinian writers
1973 births
Living people
Birzeit University alumni
Alumni of the University of Bradford
Government ministers of the State of Palestine